The Women's Beat League, founded by Felisha Ledesma, Daniela Karina Serna and Alyssa Beers, is an organization based in Portland, Oregon, that provides space for female and non-binary individuals to learn how to DJ and/or produce music in a safe and inclusive environment. Women's Beat League supports skill sharing and equipment sharing through classes, workshops, lectures and events.

References

External links

Music organizations based in the United States
Organizations based in Portland, Oregon
Women's organizations based in the United States
Women in Oregon